The Sea Beyond may refer to:

 The Sea Beyond (film), Spanish comedy-drama
 The Sea Beyond (Italian TV series)